Crayford Stadium is a greyhound racing stadium located in the London Borough of Bexley in England. The stadium, which has featured races since 1986, has private suites, a restaurant and a number of bars.

An evening meeting takes place every Tuesday, a matinée race meeting takes place on Thursday and morning meetings are held every Tuesday, Friday and Saturday. Crayford is owned by Ladbrokes Coral.

History

1980s
In 1984 Ladbrokes announced that racing would cease at the Crayford & Bexleyheath Stadium to allow plans for rebuilding the entire stadium as part of a development project. The twenty-acre site would be redeveloped, with five acres of it being converted into a new greyhound track and sports stadium. Racing ended on 18 May 1985 and work began on the new stadium. Following sixteen months of development and construction, it was ready for action. 

The grand opening took place on 1 September 1986, and the new stadium would be called Crayford after the decision was made to drop the Bexleyheath part; the stadium was situated in a different five-acre part of the original twenty acres.  The stadium was opened by the mayor of Bexley and Ladbrokes Chairman Cyril Stein.

In 1987 the track took possession of a major competition called the Golden Jacket which had struggled to find a new home since the demise of Harringay. The event had been temporarily held at Hall Green and Monmore and was a popular afternoon competition with television exposure. Crayford also provided a new matinee meeting for their Ladbrokes betting shops and another new competition called the Crayford Rosebowl was inaugurated.  In 1988 Dinky Luckhurst trained Breeks Rocket to Grand National success.

The dimensions of the all-sand circuit were a small 334 m circumference with distances of 380, 540, 714 and 874 metres with an outside Sumner hare. Facilities included a restaurant for 138 covers, two bars and a twin-tier glass-fronted covered stand. Also within the stadium was a sports hall complex, a fitness area and a swimming pool. The racing manager was Roy Dwight and general manager Roger Lakey, soon to be replaced by Paul Lawrence and Barry Stanton respectively.

1990s

In 1996 Dynamic Display repeated the Grand National achievement for trainer Barry O'Sullivan. The Guys and Dolls competition arrived at the track in 1997. Pure Patches won the 1998 Gold Collar and also made the 1999 English Greyhound Derby final and Bubbly Prince won the 1999 Cesarewitch.

2000s
Lady Jean won the 2000 Cesarewitch, and Haughty Ted won the 2001 Gold Collar for Dinky Luckhurst. Racing manager Paul Lawrence parted company with the track in 2000, replaced by Harry Bull, with Danny Rayment promoted to deputy. Trainer Lorraine Sams introduced a greyhound to the industry in 2006 called Spiridon Louis. The black-and-white dog would become the 2007 Greyhound of the Year after winning the St Leger, TV Trophy and Regency.

2010s
A third Grand National win by the Gemma Davidson-trained Plane Daddy in 2010 continued Crayford's success with hurdle racing. 

In 2015 the track resurrected the original classic Gold Collar competition and the Guys and Dolls. In 2017 Ladbrokes merged with Gala Coral to form Ladbrokes Coral.

In 2018 the stadium signed a deal with SIS to race every Tuesday morning and evening, Thursday afternoon, Friday morning and Saturday morning.

Competitions

Golden Jacket

Gold Collar

Kent St Leger

Guys And Dolls

Crayford/Kent Vase
 

(1967–1984 held at Crayford & Bexleyheath over 490 yards/462 metres), (1987–2010 held at Crayford over 540 metres)

Crayford/Kent Rosebowl

(held over 380 metres)

Track records

Current

Former

References

External links
 Official site

Greyhound racing venues in the United Kingdom
Sport in the London Borough of Bexley